Helen Alice Bower-Easton CBE (born 1978) is a British civil servant who was the first woman to serve as the Prime Minister's Official Spokesperson. She is Director of Communication at the Foreign and Commonwealth Office.

Life
Helen Bower was born in Birmingham, the daughter of John and Diana Bower. She was educated at Edgbaston High School for Girls and Cardiff University, graduating in 2001 with a BA in Economics and EU Studies with French and Italian.

Bower entered the Civil Service in 2003. In June 2015 she was appointed Official Spokesperson to the Prime Minister, the first woman to be appointed to the post. In August 2016 she was conferred a CBE in David Cameron's resignation honours list. In September 2016 the Evening Standard included her in its list of London's 1,000 most influential people. In December 2016 she left No. 10 to take up the job of Director of Communications at the Foreign Office.

References

1978 births
Living people
Alumni of Cardiff University
21st-century British civil servants
Civil servants in the Foreign Office
Commanders of the Order of the British Empire